Langhko District, also Langkho District, is a district of the Shan State in Myanmar. It consists of 4 towns in 2010.

Townships
The district contains the following townships:
Langhko Township
Mong Nai Township
Mawkmai Township
Mong Pan Township

 
Geography of Shan State
Langkho District